Rakovec nad Ondavou is a village and municipality in Michalovce District in the Kosice Region of eastern Slovakia.

Etymology
The name is of Slovak origin. It derives from rak - a crayfish.

History
In historical records the village was first mentioned in 1266.

Geography
The village lies at an altitude of 146 metres and covers an area of 15.218 km². The municipality has a population of about 1080 people.

References

External links
http://www.statistics.sk/mosmis/eng/run.html

Villages and municipalities in Michalovce District